Ex Parte Bowman 61 U.S.P.Q.2d 1669 (Bd. Pat. App. & Int. 2001) was a decision by the U.S. Board of Patent Appeals and Interferences which asserted that in order to be patent-eligible, a process had to involve or promote the technological arts.  This decision was overruled by the Board's subsequent Ex Parte Lundgren decision, but the Board's and then the Federal Circuit's In re Bilski opinion then superseded Lundgren. In re Bilski, however, rejects use of "not in the technological arts" as a basis for a rejection, although it seems to accept the concept when differently named. Bilski was affirmed by the Supreme Court in Bilski v. Kappos.

See also
 Business method patent
 Diamond v. Diehr
 Freeman-Walter-Abele Test
 State Street Bank v. Signature Financial Group
 Machine-or-transformation test

References

United States patent case law
2001 in United States case law
Decisions of the Board of Patent Appeals and Interferences
Law articles needing an infobox